Stenalia nigra is a beetle in the genus Stenalia of the family Mordellidae. It was described in 1951 by Ermisch.

References

nigra
Beetles described in 1951